Antonio Sarmiento de Luna y Enríquez (1606 – 28 July 1661) was a Roman Catholic prelate who served as Bishop of Sigüenza (1657–1661) and Bishop of Coria (1655–1657).

Biography
Antonio Sarmiento de Luna y Enríquez was born in Madrid, Spain in 1606 and ordained a priest on 6 December 1654.
On 14 May 1655, he was appointed during the papacy of Pope Alexander VII as Bishop of Coria.
On 8 April 1657, he was selected by the King of Spain and confirmed by Pope Alexander VII on 9 July 1657 as Bishop of Sigüenza.
He served as Bishop of Coria until his death on 28 July 1661.

References

External links and additional sources
 (for Chronology of Bishops) 
 (for Chronology of Bishops) 
 (for Chronology of Bishops) 
 (for Chronology of Bishops) 

17th-century Roman Catholic bishops in Spain
Bishops appointed by Pope Alexander VII
1606 births
1661 deaths